Lauri Elias Markkanen (born 22 May 1997) is a Finnish professional basketball player for the Utah Jazz of the National Basketball Association (NBA). Nicknamed "the Finnisher", he is the son of Finnish basketball players Pekka and Riikka Markkanen, and the younger brother of footballer Eero Markkanen.

Starting his career with HBA-Märsky in the Finnish second-tier league, Markkanen moved to the United States and played college basketball for the Arizona Wildcats, where he earned First-team All-Pac-12 honors in his lone year with the team. He was selected seventh overall in the 2017 NBA draft by the Minnesota Timberwolves before being included in a draft-night trade to the Chicago Bulls for Jimmy Butler. Following a stint with the Cleveland Cavaliers, Markkanen experienced a career resurgence in his first year with the Jazz, earning his first All-Star selection in 2023.

Early life and career
Markkanen grew up in Jyväskylä, and played his junior years in the local team, HoNsU. Markkanen played for HBA-Märsky in the Finnish second-tier league from 2014 to 2016.

College career
On 17 October 2015, Markkanen verbally committed to NCAA Division I squad Arizona Wildcats prior to the 2016–17 season. Lauri signed a letter of intent to Arizona on 11 November. ESPN.com reported that the seven-foot Finn was considered "a possible one-and-done candidate for the NBA draft." He became the first player since Mike Bibby to wear the jersey number 10. In January 2017, SB Nation regarded him as "the best shooting 7-footer college basketball has ever seen". Within the same month Markkanen was selected as Pac-12 Player of the Week as well as the Oscar Robertson National Player of the Week. He has also been named to the pre-season Karl Malone Award Watchlist, Naismith Award Watchlist, Wooden Award Watchlist, Wooden Award Midseason Top 25, Wayman Tisdale Award Midseason watch list, Oscar Robertson Award Midseason watch list, Karl Malone Award Finalist, Naismith Top 30 Finalist. Markkanen was among the 15 finalists for the John R. Wooden Award.

He recorded a career-high 30 points on 12 Jan against rival Arizona State. Also recording a career-high 13 rebounds three times against Northern Colorado, Washington State, and Washington. His career-high three blocks came against Arizona State in the regular season finale 4 March 2017.

Markkanen was selected to the third team All-American team by the Associated Press, NBC Sports, USA Today, and the Sporting News on 6 March 2017. He was a first team All-Pac-12 selection, as well as first team All-Pac-12 Freshman team and first team All-Pac-12 team in Associated Press.

At the conclusion of his freshman season, Markkanen announced his intention to forgo his final three years of collegiate eligibility and enter the 2017 NBA draft.

Professional career

Chicago Bulls (2017–2021)
Markkanen was drafted by the Minnesota Timberwolves with the seventh pick of the first round of the 2017 NBA draft. On draft night, his rights were traded to the Chicago Bulls along with Zach LaVine and Kris Dunn for Jimmy Butler and the rights to Justin Patton. On 5 July 2017, Markkanen signed with the Bulls.

On 19 October 2017, Markkanen made his NBA debut with the Bulls and scored 17 points. Markkanen then set an NBA record on 24 October, for most 3-pointers in the first three games of an NBA career with ten 3-pointers. Markkanen also asked former NBA player Brian Scalabrine to use his number 24, which Brian allowed. On 30 December, Markkanen scored a career-high 32 points and seven rebounds in a 119–107 win against the Indiana Pacers. On 10 January 2018, Markkanen played a career high 46 minutes, scored a career-high 33 points along with a career-high eight 3-pointers in a double overtime 122–119 win against the New York Knicks. This made him the second seven-foot player to make eight three-pointers in a game (the first being Dirk Nowitzki). On 22 January, he grabbed a career-high 17 rebounds against the New Orleans Pelicans. Four days later, Markkanen blocked a career-high three shots against the Los Angeles Lakers.

After scoring seventeen points against the Milwaukee Bucks on 28 January 2018, Markkanen surpassed Hanno Möttölä (715) as the career leading scorer among NBA players from Finland. On 22 May 2018, he was named to the NBA All-Rookie First Team. He ended his rookie season leading the Bulls in rebounds with 7.5 and fourth in scoring with 15.2; his 14 double-doubles was third among rookies behind Kyle Kuzma and Ben Simmons.

Markkanen missed the first 23 games of the season. He had a career-high 19 rebounds in a loss to the Brooklyn Nets on 28 January. He also had 31 points and 18 rebounds in a win over Brooklyn on 8 February; a career-high 35 points along with 15 rebounds in a win over the Boston Celtics on 23 February; and 31 points and 17 rebounds in win over the Atlanta Hawks on 1 March. On 28 March, Markkanen was ruled out for the rest of the season after undergoing tests for his health problems, which he experienced in a 26 March game against the Toronto Raptors. In the 52 games he did play, he was second on the team with 18.7 points and first with 9.0 rebounds and 20 double-doubles (fourth in the NBA).

Markkanen began the season tying a career-high with 35 points along with 17 rebounds in a one-point loss to the Charlotte Hornets, the most opening-day points by a Chicago Bull since Michael Jordan in 1995.

On 30 January 2021, Markkanen scored a season-high 31 points on 12-of-18 shooting from the field and 6-of-11 from three in a 122–123 loss to the Portland Trail Blazers. After the Bulls added veteran big men Daniel Theis and Nikola Vučević to their roster to fortify their frontcourt, Markkanen lost his starting spot. On 29 March, Markkanen came off the bench for the first time during the season and the second in his 194 career games, he finished with 13 points, six rebounds and an assist across 22 minutes in a 102–116 loss to the Golden State Warriors. Since Markkanen moved to the second unit, he had been given a limited time and had been playing the small forward position. In a game against the Memphis Grizzlies on 12 April, Markkanen went scoreless for the first time in his career.

Cleveland Cavaliers (2021–2022)

On 28 August 2021, Markkanen was acquired by the Cleveland Cavaliers in a three-team sign-and-trade also involving the Portland Trail Blazers. Markkanen made his Cavaliers debut on October 20, recording ten points and nine rebounds in a 121–132 loss to the Memphis Grizzlies. On March 18, 2022, he scored a season-high 31 points, alongside ten rebounds and four steals, in a 119–116 overtime win over the Denver Nuggets.

Utah Jazz (2022–present)
On 1 September 2022, Markkanen was traded, alongside Ochai Agbaji, Collin Sexton, three first round picks, and two pick swaps, to the Utah Jazz in exchange for Donovan Mitchell. On 18 November, Markkanen scored a then career-high 38 points on 15-of-18 shooting from the field, in a 134–133 win over the Phoenix Suns. On 22 December, Markkanen set a career-high with nine three-pointers on 13 attempts while also tying his then career-high 38 points in a 126–111 win over the Detroit Pistons. 

On 5 January, 2023, Markkanen put up a career high with 49 points, alongside eight rebounds, in a 131–114 win against the Houston Rockets. On 2 February, Markkanen was named to his first ever NBA All Star game as a reserve for the Western Conference. Markkanen also become the first NBA All-Star who born in a Nordic country. On 10 February, it was announced that Markkanen had been named a starter in the All-Star game as a result of injuries to Stephen Curry and Zion Williamson. On February 23, Markkanen scored 18 of his 43 points in the fourth quarter and grabbed  10 rebounds in a 120–119 overtime win over the Oklahoma City Thunder.

National team career

Junior national team
Markkanen made his international debut with the Finnish U-18 national team at the 2015 FIBA Europe Under-18 Championship. Markkanen averaged 18.2 points per game to lead the FIBA Europe Under-18 Championship in the summer of 2015. He was the top scorer in 2016 FIBA Europe Under-20 Championship tournament with an average of 24.9 points per game and was named to the All-Tournament Team.

Senior national team
Markkanen played with the Finland senior team at EuroBasket 2017, which was partly held in his home country. He led his team to the round of 16 by averaging 19.5 points and 5.7 rebounds over 6 games.

He played his second EuroBasket tournament in 2022. In the Round of 16, Markkanen scored 43 points to lead Finland to a 94–86 win over Croatia, setting a new all-time record for a Finnish player at the EuroBasket. The win also lead to Finland's first quarterfinal appearance in 55 years, the last being in 1967. Finland lost in the following quarterfinals to Spain. Markkanen averaged 27.9 points on 54.2 percent shooting, and eight rebounds over seven games.

Career statistics

NBA

Regular season

|-
| style="text-align:left;"|
| style="text-align:left;"|Chicago
| 68 || 68 || 29.7 || .434 || .362 || .843 || 7.5 || 1.2 || .6 || .6 || 15.2
|-
| style="text-align:left;"|
| style="text-align:left;"|Chicago
| 52 || 51 || 32.3 || .430 || .361 || .872 || 9.0 || 1.4 || .7 || .6 || 18.7
|-
| style="text-align:left;"|
| style="text-align:left;"|Chicago
| 50 || 50 || 29.8 || .425 || .344 || .824 || 6.3 || 1.5 || .8 || .5 || 14.7
|-
| style="text-align:left;"|
| style="text-align:left;"|Chicago
| 51 || 26 || 25.8 || .480 || .402 || .826 || 5.3 || .9 || .5 || .3 || 13.6
|-
| style="text-align:left;"|
| style="text-align:left;"|Cleveland
| 61 || 61 || 30.8 || .445 || .358 || .868 || 5.7 || 1.3 || .7 || .5 || 14.8
|- class="sortbottom"
| style="text-align:center;" colspan="2"|Career
| 282 || 256 || 29.7 || .441 || .364 || .850 || 6.8 || 1.3 || .7 || .5 || 15.4
|- class="sortbottom"
| style="text-align:center;" colspan="2"| All-Star
| 1 || 1 || 26.0 || .462 || .167 || – || 7.0 || .0 || .0 || .0 || 13.0

College

|-
| style="text-align:left;"|2016–17
| style="text-align:left;"|Arizona
| 37 || 37 || 30.8 || .492 || .423 || .835 || 7.2 || .9 || .4 || .5 || 15.6

NBA records
 Fastest player to reach 100 career three-pointers (41 games)
 Most consecutive games with a made three by a seven-footer (48 games)

Personal life
He is the son of Pekka and Riikka Markkanen (née Ellonen), who both were professional basketball players, and has two brothers, former professional basketball player Miikka and professional footballer Eero. In February 2018, Markkanen and his wife Verna Aho had a son together. In October 2020, their second child was born.

References

External links

 Arizona Wildcats bio

1997 births
Living people
All-American college men's basketball players
Arizona Wildcats men's basketball players
Centers (basketball)
Chicago Bulls players
Cleveland Cavaliers players
Finnish expatriate basketball people in the United States
Finnish men's basketball players
Minnesota Timberwolves draft picks
Power forwards (basketball)
Sportspeople from Jyväskylä
Utah Jazz players